Ptiloscola is a genus of moths in the family Saturniidae erected by Charles Duncan Michener in 1949.

Species
Ptiloscola bipunctata Lemaire, 1972
Ptiloscola burmeisteri Meister & Brechlin, 2008
Ptiloscola cinerea (Schaus, 1900)
Ptiloscola dargei Lemaire, 1971
Ptiloscola descimoni Lemaire, 1971
Ptiloscola lilacina (Schaus, 1900)
Ptiloscola paraguayensis Brechlin, Meister & Drechsel, 2008
Ptiloscola photophila (W. Rothschild, 1907)
Ptiloscola rorerae (Schaus, 1928)
Ptiloscola surrotunda (Dyar, 1925)
Ptiloscola wellingi Lemaire, 1971
Ptiloscola wolfei Brechlin & Meister, 2008

References

Ceratocampinae